The 2021 GT World Challenge Europe 3 Hours of Monza was an endurance motor race for the GT World Challenge Europe Endurance Cup, the first race of the 2021 GT World Challenge Europe Endurance Cup, held on 18 April 2021 at the Autodromo Nazionale di Monza in Monza, Italy.

Classification

Qualifying

 – The #90 MadPanda Motorsport entry only set a valid time in 2 of the 3 sessions, requiring it to start behind all entries that had set a valid time in all 3 sessions.
 – The #222 Allied Racing entry crashed in pre-qualifying and was withdrawn from the event.

Race

Standings after the event

Pro Cup standings

Silver Cup standings

Pro-Am Cup standings

 Note: Only the top five positions are included for both sets of standings.

References

External links
Official website
Race replay

|- style="text-align:center"
|width="35%"|Previous race:
|width="30%"|GT World Challenge Europe Endurance Cup2021 season
|width="40%"|Next race:

Monza
Monza 3 Hours
Monza 3 Hours